Bluedot is a  music, science and culture event held annually in July since 2016 at Jodrell Bank Observatory in Cheshire, England, combining music, live science experiments, expert talks and immersive artworks.

The event is endorsed by the University of Manchester, current owners of the observatory.

The festival is named after Pale Blue Dot, a famous 1990 photograph of planet Earth popularised by Carl Sagan.

In May 2022, it was announced the live entertainment platform, Superstruct Entertainment has acquired a majority stake in Bluedot.

Musical performances
Since 2016, acts performing at the bluedot festival have included Orbital, Underworld, Alt-J, Goldfrapp, Jean-Michel Jarre, The Chemical Brothers, Gary Numan and The Flaming Lips.

Kraftwerk headlined Saturday at the 2019 event, alongside New Order and Hot Chip.

The 2020 festival was due to feature Björk, Groove Armada and Metronomy, however the event was cancelled due to the COVID-19 pandemic. The acts were rescheduled to headline the festival in July 2021. However, the festival was cancelled for a second time due to COVID-19, citing the lack of insurance from the British government to cover financial losses if the event were to be cancelled for COVID-19-related reasons. Bluedot returned in July 2022, with Björk headlining.

Science talks
The festival has included talks and demonstrations from 
 Jim Al-Khalili
 Teresa Anderson
 Sarah Bridle 
 Philippa Browning 
 Richard Dawkins
 Brian Cox 
 Tamsin Edwards
 Tim O'Brien 
 Lisa Harvey-Smith 
 Jess Wade 
 Heather Williams

References

Science festivals
Music festivals in Cheshire